Hypnelus is a genus of birds in the family Bucconidae. It contains 2 species of South American puffbirds. Some taxonomic authorities consider both species to be conspecific, together taking the name russet-throated puffbird.

Species

References

 Museum Heineanum, p. 143

 
Bird genera